Wildhoney is an American band from Baltimore, Maryland.

History
Wildhoney began in 2012, releasing their debut self-titled EP the following year. Wildhoney released their second EP, Seventeen Forever, in 2014 on  Photobooth Records.

In 2015, Wildhoney signed to Topshelf Records, and released an EP titled Your Face Sideways the same year. Wildhoney released their debut full-length album, Sleep Through It, in 2015 on Deranged/Forward Records.

Band members
Lauren Shusterich (vocals)
Joe Trainor (guitar)
Zach Inscho (drums)
Nathan O'Dell (guitar)
Alan Everhart (bass)

Discography
Studio albums
Sleep Through It (2015, Deranged/Forward)
EPs
Wildhoney (2013, Nostalgium DIrective)
Seventeen Forever (2014, Photobooth)
Your Face Sideways (2015, Topshelf)
Continental Drift Compilation (2016, Slumberland/Fortuna Pop!)

References

Musical groups established in 2012
Musical groups from Baltimore
Topshelf Records artists
2012 establishments in Maryland